World Bowl '97 (also referred to as World Bowl V) was the final game of the 1997 WLAF season in American football. It was the fifth championship game of the World League of American Football (WLAF), and the third since the WLAF adopted a six-team European format.

The game was held at Estadi Olimpic de Montjuic in Barcelona, Spain on Sunday, June 22, 1997. The game was played between the 7–3 Rhein Fire and the 5–5 Barcelona Dragons. 31,100 fans were in attendance as the Dragons won their first and only World Bowl title in franchise history by beating the Fire 38–24. Dragons quarterback Jon Kitna was given MVP honors after completing 23 of 31 attempts for 401 yards with two touchdowns and one interception.

Background
The Dragons won the first meeting 27–12 in Düsseldorf, while the Fire won the second meeting 38–23 in Barcelona.

Game summary
The Rhein Fire managed to get the game's early sparks going as they had a nine-play, 46-yard drive that led to a 31-yard field goal by Manfred Burgsmüller. However, the Dragons would put up some real firepower, as Dragons quarterback Jon Kitna led a four-play, 80-yard drive that was capped off with a 13-yard run by running back Terry Wilburn. Then, more than halfway through the first quarter, as Rhein began a drive from deep in their own territory, quarterback T. J. Rubley threw an interception towards Dragons safety Carlos Brooks, who returned the ball 16 yards for a touchdown. In the second quarter, the fireworks managed to start flying. Rubley would lead a seven-play, 39-yard drive and cap it off with a touchdown on a three-yard quarterback sneak. However, Kitna and the Dragons would respond with a four-play, 79-yard drive that concluded with a 66-yard touchdown pass to wide receiver Marco Martos. Then, a little later in the quarter, the Dragons would further increase their lead with a five-play, 80-yard drive that ended with a 40-yard pass to wide receiver Alfonzo Browning. However, the Rhein Fire refused to trail 28–10 at halftime. Near the end of the half, Rubley would lead a nine-play, 56-yard drive that concluded with him running the ball in for a touchdown on a one-yard quarterback sneak. In the third quarter, both sides had their defenses stiffen throughout most of the quarter. However, the Dragons would eventually get an eight-play, 90-yard drive working for them, as Terry Wilburn capped off the drive with a four-yard touchdown run. Trailing 35–17 heading into the fourth quarter, the Rhein Fire had to get some points quick and fast. Unfortunately for them, the only score that they could get in the final quarter was a 22-yard pass from Rubley to wide receiver Sean Foster. The Dragons then capped off their World Bowl title with a 34-yard field goal by Spanish kicker Jesús Angoy.

References

World Bowl
1997 in American football
World Bowl
June 1997 sports events in Europe
1997 in Spanish sport